Asmus may refer to:

 Asmus, Poland, a village in Poland
 Matthias Claudius (1740–1815), a German poet and journalist, known by the penname of Asmus
 ASMUS, Data asset management strategy developed by the Public Sector Commission, Western Australia

People with the last name Asmus 
 Hermann Asmus (1887–1968), a German art director
 James Asmus, an American writer, actor and comedian
 John F. Asmus (born 1937), an American research physicist 
 Kristina Asmus (born 1988), a Russian theater and film actress
 Lena Asmus (born 1982), a Russian and later German rhythmic gymnast
 Marion Asmus, birth name of Marion Boyars (1927–1999), a British book publisher
 Ronald Asmus (1957–2011), an American diplomat and political analyst
 Valentin Ferdinandovich Asmus (1894–1975), a Russian philosopher
 Walter D. Asmus (born 1941), a German theater director

People with the first name Asmus 
 Asmus Ehrenreich von Bredow (1693–1756), a Prussian Lieutenant General
 Asmus Jacob Carstens (1754–1798), a Danish-German painter
 Asmus Tietchens (born 1947), a German composer of avant-garde music

See also
Asmus & Clark, an architectural firm based in Nashville, Tennessee
Asmus v. Pacific Bell, a U.S. labor law case

Surnames from given names